Swanton Local School District is a school district in Northwest Ohio, USA., which serves students who live in the village of Swanton, located in Fulton County and Lucas County, and including portions of Fulton, Swancreek, Spencer, Harding and Swanton townships. The superintendent is Chris Lake, and the current board of education consists of Kris Oberheim – (president), Ben Remer (vice president), David Smith and John Schaller.

Grades K-5
Swanton Elementary School

Grades 6-8
Swanton Middle School

Grades 9-12
Swanton High School

School districts in Ohio
Education in Fulton County, Ohio